Alexander Pollock Moore (November 10, 1867 – February 17, 1930) was an American diplomat, editor and publisher.

Biography
Born in Pittsburgh on November 10, 1867, Moore was the publisher/owner of the Pittsburgh Leader when he married the stage actress Lillian Russell, becoming her fourth husband in 1912.

He was a delegate to the Republican National Convention from Pennsylvania in 1916.

After his wife died on June 6, 1922, Moore served as an ambassador twice: to Spain from 1923 to 1925 and to Peru from 1928 to 1929. As the Ambassador to Peru he played a significant role in negotiating the Tacna-Arica boundary agreement, settling a border dispute between Peru and Chile.

He died on February 17, 1930, in Los Angeles, California, shortly after he was appointed ambassador to Poland by President Hoover, and was interred at the Allegheny Cemetery in Pittsburgh.

References

Time June 3, 1929

External links

"Actress Lillian Russell sitting with her husband Alexander Moore" (photo). Chicago, Illinois: Chicago History Museum, retrieved online February 21, 2023.

1867 births
1930 deaths
Ambassadors of the United States to Spain
Ambassadors of the United States to Peru
Burials at Allegheny Cemetery
People from Pittsburgh
Pennsylvania Republicans
20th-century American diplomats